A global depository receipt (GDR and sometimes spelled depositary) is a general name for a depositary receipt where a certificate issued by a depository bank, which purchases shares of foreign companies, creates a security on a local exchange backed by those shares. They are the global equivalent of the original American depositary receipts (ADR) on which they are based. GDRs represent ownership of an underlying number of shares of a foreign company and are commonly used to invest in companies from developing or emerging markets by investors in developed markets.

Prices of global depositary receipt are based on the values of related shares, but they are traded and settled independently of the underlying share. Typically, 1 GDR is equal to 10 underlying shares, but any ratio can be used. It is a negotiable instrument which is denominated in some freely convertible currency. GDRs enable a company, the issuer, to access investors in capital markets outside of its home country.

Several international banks issue GDRs, such as JPMorgan Chase, Citigroup, Deutsche Bank, and The Bank of New York Mellon. GDRs are often listed in the Frankfurt Stock Exchange, Luxembourg Stock Exchange, and the London Stock Exchange, where they are traded on the International Order Book (IOB).

Characteristics
 It is an unsecured security
 It may be converted into number of shares
 Interest and redemption price is public in foreign agency
 It is listed and traded on the stock exchange
 Holders of a GDR do not carry any voting rights

Usage
If for example an Indian company which has issued ADRs in the American market wishes to further extend it to other developed and advanced countries such as in Europe, then they can sell these ADRs to the public of Europe and the same would be named as GDR.
GDR can be issued in more than one country and can be denominated in any freely convertible currency.

See also
 Depositary receipt
 American Depositary Receipt
 European depositary receipt
 Luxembourg Depositary Receipt
 Indian Depository Receipt
 Cross listing

References

External links
 Deutsche Bank's depositary receipt website
 Global depository receipts
 BNY Mellon ADRs
 Frankfurt Stock Exchange

Depositary receipts
Banking